The All-Ireland Senior Hurling Championship 1928 was the 42nd series of the All-Ireland Senior Hurling Championship, Ireland's premier hurling knock-out competition.  Cork won the championship, beating Galway 6-12 to 1-0 in the final.

Format

All-Ireland Championship

Semi-final: (1 match) The Leinster and Munster champions were drawn to play each other in a lone semi-final.  One team was eliminated at this stage while the winners advanced to the All-Ireland final.

Final: (1 match) Galway received a bye to this stage of the championship and played the winners of the lone semi-final.  The winners were declared All-Ireland champions.

Results

Leinster Senior Hurling Championship

Munster Senior Hurling Championship

Ulster Senior Hurling Championship

All-Ireland Senior Hurling Championship

References

Sources

 Corry, Eoghan, The GAA Book of Lists (Hodder Headline Ireland, 2005).
 Donegan, Des, The Complete Handbook of Gaelic Games (DBA Publications Limited, 2005).

See also

1928